"Il était un petit navire" is a traditional French song that is now considered a children's song, despite its macabre tone.

The song tells the story of a young sailor who is about to be eaten by the other sailors. They discuss how to cook the man and what sauce to use. He then prays for the Virgin Mary's intercession and is saved by a miracle.

This song might refer to the famous wreck of the Medusa, immortalised in the painting The Raft of the Medusa by Théodore Géricault.

In popular culture 
 Soldiers sing this song in the film La grande illusion.
 In the 2020 film The Man in the Hat, two musicians aboard a ferry sing this song.
 The bard Cacofonix starts to sing this song to Roman slaves on a boat in Asterix the Gladiator.
 The song is featured in the Mad Men episode "Tomorrowland".
 The song is sung by Anne Boleyn in the television series The Tudors, Episode 9 of Season 2 "The Act of Treason".
 Sung in its former version by 'la grenouille' at the end of Pirates (1986 film).
 On Peter, Paul and Mary's Discovered: Live in Concert album, which was released on November 18, 2014, Peter Yarrow and Noel Paul Stookey sing an adapted English version.
A verse is used in the intro to episode 4 of Marianne.
 In 2019, the song is covered by French pop singer Nolwenn Leroy.

Lyrics (French)
Il était un petit navire {x2}
Qui n’avait ja-ja-jamais navigué {x2}
Ohé ! Ohé !

{Refrain:}

Ohé ! Ohé ! Matelot,
Matelot navigue sur les flots
Ohé ! Ohé ! Matelot,
Matelot navigue sur les flots

Il entreprit un long voyage {x2}
Sur la mer Mé-Mé-Méditerranée {x2}
Ohé ! Ohé !

Au bout de cinq à six semaines, (x2)
Les vivres vin-vin-vinrent à manquer (x2)
Ohé ! Ohé !

On tira à la courte paille, (x2)
Pour savoir qui-qui-qui serait mangé, (x2)
Ohé ! Ohé !

Le sort tomba sur le plus jeune, (x2)
C’est donc lui qui-qui-qui fut désigné, (x2)
Ohé ! Ohé !

On cherche alors à quelle sauce, (x2)
Le pauvre enfant-fant-fant sera mangé, (x2)
Ohé ! Ohé !

L’un voulait qu’on le mît à frire, (x2)
L’autre voulait-lait-lait le fricasser, (x2)
Ohé ! Ohé !

Pendant qu’ainsi l’on délibère, (x2)
Il monte en haut-haut-haut du grand hunier, (x2)
Ohé ! Ohé !

Il fait au ciel une prière (x2)
Interrogeant-geant-geant l’immensité, (x2)
Ohé ! Ohé !

Mais regardant la mer entière, (x2)
Il vit des flots-flots-flots de tous côtés, (x2)
Ohé ! Ohé !

Oh ! Sainte Vierge ma patronne, (x2)
Cria le pau-pau-pauvre infortuné, (x2)
Ohé ! Ohé !

Si j’ai péché, vite pardonne, (x2)
Empêche-les-les-les de me manger, (x2)
Ohé ! Ohé !

Au même instant un grand miracle, (x2)
Pour l’enfant fut-fut-fut réalisé, (x2)
Ohé ! Ohé !

Des p’tits poissons dans le navire, (x2)
Sautèrent par-par-par et par milliers, (x2)
Ohé ! Ohé !

On les prit, on les mit à frire, (x2)
Le jeune mou-mou-mousse fut sauvé, (x2)
Ohé ! Ohé !

Si cette histoire vous amuse, (x2)
Nous allons la-la-la recommencer, (x2)
Ohé ! Ohé !

Lyrics (English) 
There was once a little boat (x2) 
That never on the sea had sailed (x2) 
Ahoy! Ahoy!

Chorus:
Ahoy! Ahoy! Sailor, 
Sailor sailing on the high sea 
Ahoy! Ahoy! Sailor, 
Sailor sailing on the high sea

It undertook a long journey, (x2) 
On the Mediterranean sea, (x2) 
Ahoy! Ahoy!

(Chorus)

After five or six weeks, (x2) 
Rations began to wane (x2) 
Ahoy! Ahoy!

(Chorus)

Straws were drawn all around, (x2) 
To figure out who'd be eaten, (x2)
 Ahoy! Ahoy!

(Chorus)

Fate selected the youngest boy, (x2) 
It was thus him that was called, (x2) 
Ahoy! Ahoy!

(Chorus)

Now t'was wondered with what sauce, (x2) 
The poor boy would be eaten, (x2) 
Ahoy! Ahoy!

(Chorus)

One wanted to fry him shallow, (x2) 
Other cook him in a stew, (x2) 
Ahoy! Ahoy!

(Chorus)

As the decision was being made, (x2) 
He clambered to t'top of the tallest sail, (x2) 
Ahoy! Ahoy!

(Chorus)

He implored heaven with a prayer, (x2) 
Called out to infinity, (x2) 
Ahoy ! Ahoy !

(Chorus)

Looking upon the surrounding sea, (x2) 
He saw naught but waves as far as eyes could see, (x2) 
Ahoy! Ahoy !

(Chorus)

Hail! Blessed Virgin Mary, (x2) 
Cried out the unlucky boy, (x2)
Ahoy! Ahoy!

(Chorus)

If I have sinned, quickly forgive, (x2) 
Please stop them from eating me, (x2) 
Ahoy! Ahoy!

(Chorus)

At that moment, a miracle, (x2) 
For the boy was performed, (x2) 
Ahoy! Ahoy!

(Chorus)

Small fishes upon the deck, (x2) 
Leapt by the thousands, (x2) 
Ahoy! Ahoy!

(Chorus)

Quickly they were grabbed and fried, (x2) 
And the ship's boy was saved, (x2) 
Ahoy! Ahoy!

(Chorus)

If to your liking was this tale, (x2) 
Well, let us tell it again, (x2) 
Ahoy! Ahoy!

(Chorus)

In other languages

 German: War einst ein kleines Segelschiffchen
 Greek: Ήταν ένα μικρό καράβι [Itan ena mikro karavi]

References

External links 

French folk songs
French children's songs
Songs about cannibalism
Songs about boats
Sea shanties
Traditional children's songs
Year of song unknown
Songwriter unknown